Trefler is a surname. Notable people with the surname include:

 Alan Trefler (born 1956), American businessman and chess player
 Daniel Trefler (born 1959), Canadian economist